A hīkoi is a walk or march, and especially a protest march or parade, in New Zealand. The word comes from the Māori language, and often implies a long journey taking many days or weeks. The most famous hīkoi was the 1975 Māori Land March, on which supporters and protestors travelled the length of the North Island, from Cape Reinga to Parliament in Wellington, organised by Whina Cooper.

In 2004, a large hīkoi was organised during the 2004 Foreshore and seabed controversy in opposition to the nationalisation of New Zealand's foreshore and seabed along the coastline. Marchers travelled on foot through cities and towns and in motor vehicles in rural areas.

A hīkoi with between 500 and 700 participants took place in Auckland on 25 May 2009, following an indication by the National government that it would not heed a Royal commission recommendation that the proposed council for the Auckland supercity include dedicated Māori seats.

See also
Māori protest movement

References

Māori politics
Protests in New Zealand
Marching
Protests
Māori words and phrases